Get Shorty is an American comedy-drama television series, based on the 1990 novel of the same name by Elmore Leonard. Created by Davey Holmes, it premiered on August 13, 2017, on Epix. It stars Chris O'Dowd, Ray Romano, Sean Bridgers, Carolyn Dodd, Lidia Porto, Goya Robles, Megan Stevenson, Lucy Walters, and Sarah Stiles. It has aired for three seasons, consisting of twenty-seven episodes. In December 2018, it was renewed for a third season, which began airing on October 6, 2019. Although no further seasons have been commissioned, Epix has not officially cancelled the show.

The series does not use the plot or any characters from the novel. The film borrows only the novel's basic premise of a gangster who attempts to produce a film and a low-budget movie director indebted to organized crime, as well as Leonard's darkly comedic tone. For that reason, the series has been described as more of an "homage" than an adaptation. The novel was previously adapted for the 1995 film of the same name.

Premise
Get Shorty follows Miles Daly, who works as muscle for a murderous crime ring in Nevada. For the sake of his daughter, he attempts to change professions and become a movie producer, laundering money through a Hollywood film. But instead of leaving the criminal world behind, he accidentally brings it with him to Los Angeles. Daly ends up working with Rick Moreweather, a washed-up producer of low-quality films who becomes Miles's partner and guide through the maze of Hollywood.

Cast and characters

Main
 Chris O'Dowd as Miles Daly, an enforcer for Amara De Escalones, a casino owner and gang boss in Pahrump, Nevada. Daly seeks to escape his criminal lifestyle and enter into the film industry
 Ray Romano as Rick Moreweather, a film producer
 Sean Bridgers as Louis Darnell, Miles's partner
 Carolyn Dodd as Emma Daly, Miles's and Katie's daughter. Miles's pet name for her is 'Shorty'
 Lidia Porto as Amara De Escalones
 Goya Robles as Yago, Amara's hot-headed nephew and lieutenant in her organization.
 Megan Stevenson as April Quinn
 Lucy Walters as Katie Daly, Miles' wife (S1), later ex-wife (S2)
 Sarah Stiles as Gladys Parrish (seasons 2-3; recurring season 1)
 Isaac Keys as Ed

Recurring

 Sasha Feldman as Bliz
 Bryan Lugo as Ross
 Ryan Begay as Clipper
 Billy Magnussen as Nathan Hill
 Bruce McIntosh as George
 Peter Stormare as Hafdis Snaejornsson, the director of the first film Miles and Rick produced, The Admiral's Mistress.
 Kristoffer Polaha as Jeffrey
 Phil LaMarr as Brandon Fisher
 Antwon Tanner as Lyle
 Paul Adelstein as Wes Krupke
 Topher Grace as Tyler Mathis
 Andrea Rosen as Caroline
 Felicity Huffman as Clara Dillard (season 2), a mothering, high-level special agent for the FBI.
 Steven Weber as Laurence Budd (seasons 2 & 3), a powerful film producer in Hollywood. A medical condition has left him hairless, so he glues on a wig and eyebrows. He collaborates on a film with Miles and Rick.
 Andrew Leeds as Ken Stevenson (season 2), an FBI special agent and the partner of Clara Dillard.
 Amy Seimetz as Jinny (season 2), a mysterious love interest for Miles.
 Alex Sawyer as David Oumou (season 2), an actor working a day job, until a murder brings him attention and turns him into an overnight star.
 Sonya Walger as  Lila (season 2 & 3), a woman who represents the L.A. wing of a deadly drug cartel.
 Raymond Cruz as Swayze (season 2), the leader of a Latino prison gang.
 Heather Graham as Hannah (seasons 2 & 3), a woman who runs a banana stand and has a flirtation with Rick.
 Seychelle Gabriel as Giulia (season 3)
 Michaela Watkins as Ali Egan (season 3)

Guest

 Alan Arkin as Eugene ("The Yips")
 Jim Piddock as Julian Pynter ("A Man of Letters")
 Dean Norris as Bob Grace ("Grace Under Pressure")
 Peter Bogdanovich as Giustino Moreweather, Rick's elderly father. ("Turnaround", "Selenite")

Episodes

Season 1 (2017)

Season 2 (2018)

Season 3 (2019)

Production

Development
A first season order of ten episodes was announced by Epix on May 24, 2016. Davey Holmes was hired to write the series, and Epix president and CEO Mark S. Greenberg said of him, "Davey Holmes is a tremendous talent and has created a fantastic new series that is in the spirit of Leonard's unique brand of social satire and strong narrative voice." The first season premiered on August 13, 2017.

Shortly after the first season premier, Epix announced that the series had been renewed for a second ten-episode season. In December 2018, the show renewed for a third season consisting of seven episodes.

Casting
Chris O'Dowd and Ray Romano were cast in the series' lead roles in August 2016. Sean Bridgers, Lidia Porto, Megan Stevenson, Goya Robles, Lucy Walters, and Carolyn Dodd joined the main cast by November of that year, and Sarah Stiles was cast in a recurring role. By early 2017, Antwon Tanner was cast in a recurring role.

By February 2018, Felicity Huffman, Steven Weber, and Andrew Leeds were cast in recurring roles, and Sarah Stiles had been upgraded from recurring role to a starring one. In March 2018, it was reported that Amy Seimetz, Alex Sawyer, and Sonya Walger had joined the series in a recurring capacity. In May 2018, it was announced that Raymond Cruz had been cast in a recurring role.

Filming
Principal photography for season one occurred from late-2016 through May 2017 in Albuquerque, New Mexico and Los Angeles, California. Filming for season two began in February 2018 with production for the whole season expected to take place in Los Angeles, California.
Season three was filmed in Vancouver, British Columbia with additional photography taking place in Los Angeles.

Release

Marketing
On May 25, 2017, a trailer for the first season was released. On July 20, 2018, a trailer for the second season was released.

Premiere
On June 10, 2018, the series held a screening of the second season premiere at the annual ATX Television Festival in Austin, Texas. Following the screening, a question-and-answer panel was held featuring creator Davey Holmes, producer/director Adam Arkin, and actors Chris O’Dowd and Lidia Porto. On September 9, 2018, the series took part in the 12th annual PaleyFest Fall Television Previews which featured a preview screening of season two and a conversation with creator and executive producer Davey Holmes and director Adam Arkin, among other guests.

Reception

Critical response
The first season was met with a positive response from critics. On Rotten Tomatoes, the first season holds a 78% approval rating with an average rating of 7.35 out of 10 based on 27 reviews. The website's critical consensus reads "Get Shortys slick production values are complemented by its seasoned cast's chemistry to create a fun-filled, if violent, first season that lives up to its source material." Metacritic, which uses a weighted average, assigned the season a score of 71 out of 100 based on 19 reviews, indicating "generally favorable reviews".

Awards and nominations

References

External links
 
 

2010s American comedy-drama television series
2017 American television series debuts
Television series by MGM Television
2010s American crime drama television series
American crime comedy television series
English-language television shows
Television shows set in Los Angeles
MGM+ original programming
Television shows based on American novels
Television shows filmed in Vancouver